Mutual fund fees and expenses are charges that may be incurred by investors who hold mutual funds. Operating a mutual fund involves costs, including shareholder transaction costs, investment advisory fees, and marketing and distribution expenses. Funds pass along these costs to investors in several ways.

Some funds impose "shareholder fees" directly on investors whenever they buy or sell shares. In addition, every fund has regular, recurring, fund-wide "operating expenses". Funds typically pay their operating expenses out of fund assets—which means that investors indirectly pay these costs. Although they may seem negligible, fees and expenses can substantially reduce an investor's earnings when the investment is held for a long period of time.

For the reasons cited above, it is important for a prospective investor to compare the fees of the various funds under consideration. Investors should also compare fees against industry benchmarks and averages. There are many different types of fees, as discussed below. To facilitate the comparison of funds, it is helpful to compare the total expense ratio. The following table shows the weighted average total expense ratios for different types of mutual funds organized in the United States as of December 31, 2020, as published by Morningstar, Inc.

Transaction fees

Purchase fee
Purchase Fee—A type of fee that some funds charge their shareholders when they buy shares. Unlike a front-end sales load, a purchase fee is paid to the fund (not to a Stockbroker) and is typically imposed to defray some of the fund's costs associated with the purchase.

Redemption fee
Redemption Fee—another type of fee that some funds charge their shareholders when they sell or redeem shares. Unlike a deferred sales load, a redemption fee is paid to the fund (not to a Stockbroker) and is typically used to defray fund costs associated with a shareholder's redemption.

Exchange fee
Exchange Fee—a fee that some funds impose on shareholders if they exchange (transfer) to another fund within the same "family of funds".

Periodic fees

Management fee
Management fees are fees that are paid out of fund assets to the fund's investment adviser for investment portfolio management, any other management fees payable to the fund's investment adviser or its affiliates, and administrative fees payable to the investment adviser that are not included in the "Other Expenses" category (discussed below). They are also called maintenance fees.

Account fee
Account fees are fees that some funds separately impose on investors in connection with the maintenance of their accounts. For example, some funds impose an account maintenance fee on accounts whose value is less than a certain dollar amount.

Distribution and service fee
Distribution and service fees are fees paid by the fund out of fund assets to cover the costs of marketing and selling fund shares and sometimes to cover the costs of providing shareholder services. They are also called 12b-1 fees after section 12 of the Investment Company Act of 1940. "Distribution fees" include fees to compensate brokers and others who sell fund shares and to pay for advertising, the printing and mailing of prospectuses to new investors, and the printing and mailing of sales literature. "Shareholder Service Fees" are fees paid to persons to respond to investor inquiries and provide investors with information about their investments. Shareholder Servicing Fees can be paid inside or outside of a Rule 12b-1 Plan.

Funds can charge up to 0.25% in distribution fees and still describe themselves as "no-load".

Other operating expenses

Transaction costs
These costs are incurred in the trading of the fund's assets. Funds with a high turnover ratio, or investing in illiquid or exotic markets usually face higher transaction costs. Unlike the total expense ratio these costs are usually not reported.

Loads

Definition of a load
Load funds exhibit a "Sales Load" with a percentage charge levied on purchase or sale of shares.  A load is a type of commission.  Depending on the type of load a mutual fund exhibits, charges may be incurred at the time of purchase, time of sale, or a mix of both.  The different types of loads are outlined below.

Front-end load
Often associated with class 'A' shares of a mutual fund.  Also known as Sales Charge, this is a fee paid when shares are purchased. Also known as a "front-end load", this fee typically goes to the brokers that sell the fund's shares. Front-end loads reduce the amount of your investment. For example, let's say you have $1,000 and want to invest it in a mutual fund with a 5% front-end load. The $50 sales load you must pay comes off the top, and the remaining $950 will be invested in the fund. The Maximum sales load under the Investment Company Act of 1940 is 9%. The maximum sales load under NASD Rules is 8%.

Back-end load
Associated with class "B" mutual fund shares.  Known as a Contingent Deferred Sales Charge (CDSC or sometimes Deferred Sales Charge), this is a fee paid when shares are sold. Also known as a "back-end load", this fee typically goes to the stockbrokers that sell the fund's shares. Back-end loads start with a fee of about 5 to 6 percent, which incrementally discounts for each year that the investors own the fund’s shares. The rate at which the fee declines is disclosed in the prospectus. The amount of this type of load will depend on how long the investor holds his or her shares and typically decreases to zero if the investor holds his or her shares long enough.

Level load/low load
It's similar to a back-end load in that no sales charges are paid when buying the fund.  Instead, a back-end load may be charged if the shares purchased are sold within a given time frame.  The distinction between level loads and low loads as opposed to back-end loads is that this time frame where charges are levied is shorter.

No-load fund
Associated with Class "C" Shares.  As the name implies, this means that the fund does not charge any type of sales load. But, as outlined above, not every type of shareholder fee is a "sales load". A no-load fund may charge fees that are not sales loads, such as purchase fees, redemption fees, exchange fees, and account fees. Class "C" shares have the highest annual expense charges.

Geographical differences

United States

Breakpoints

Some mutual funds that charge front-end sales loads will charge lower sales loads for larger investments. The investment levels required to obtain a reduced sales load are commonly referred to as "breakpoints".

The SEC does not require a fund to offer breakpoints in the fund's sales load. But, if breakpoints exist, the fund must disclose them. In addition, a Financial Industry Regulatory Authority (FINRA) member brokerage firm should not sell you shares of a fund in an amount that is "just below" the fund's sales load breakpoint simply to earn a higher commission.

Each fund company establishes its own formula for how it will calculate whether an investor is entitled to receive a breakpoint. For that reason, it is important to seek out breakpoint information from your financial advisor or the fund itself. You'll need to ask how a particular fund establishes eligibility for breakpoint discounts, as well as what the fund's breakpoint amounts are.

Share class differences

Class A shares typically impose a front-end sales load. They also tend to have a lower 12b-1 fee and lower annual expenses than other mutual fund share classes. Be aware that some mutual funds reduce the front-end load as the size of your investment increases. If you're considering Class A shares, be sure to inquire about breakpoints.
Class B shares typically do not have a front-end sales load. Instead, they may impose a contingent deferred sales load and a 12b-1 fee (along with other annual expenses). Class B shares also might convert automatically to Class A shares with a lower 12b-1 fee if the investor holds the shares long enough.
Class C shares might have a 12b-1 fee, other annual expenses, and either a front- or back-end sales load. But the front- or back-end load for Class C shares tends to be lower than for Class A or Class B shares, respectively. Unlike Class B shares, Class C shares generally do not convert to another class. Class C shares tend to have higher annual expenses than either Class A or Class B shares.

One notable component of the expense ratio of U.S. funds is the "12b-1 fee", which represents expenses used for advertising and promotion of the fund. 12b-1 fees are paid by the fund out of mutual fund assets and are generally limited to a maximum of 1.00% per year (.75% distribution and .25% shareholder servicing) under FINRA Rules.

Waivers, reimbursements and recoupments

Some funds will execute "waiver or reimbursement agreements" with the fund's adviser or other service providers, especially when a fund is new and expenses tend to be higher (due to a small asset base). These agreements generally reduce expenses to some pre-determined level or by some pre-determined amount. Sometimes these waiver/reimbursement amounts must be repaid by the fund during a period that generally cannot exceed 3 years from the year in which the original expense was incurred. If a recoupment plan is in effect, the effect may be to require future shareholders to absorb expenses of the fund incurred during prior years. 
   
Changes in expense ratio (fixed and variable expenses)

Generally, unlike past performance, expenses are very predictive. Funds with high expenses ratios tend to continue to have high expenses ratios. An investor can examine a fund's "Financial Highlights" which is contained in both the periodic financial reports and the fund's prospectus, and determine a fund's expense ratio over the last five years (if the fund has five years of history). It is very hard for a fund to significantly lower its expense ratio once it has had a few years of operational history. This is because funds have both fixed and variable expenses, but most expenses are variable. Variable costs are fixed on a percentage basis. For example, assuming there are no breakpoints, a .75% management fee will always consume .75% of fund assets, regardless of any increase in assets under management. The total management fee will vary based on the assets under management, but it will always be .75% of assets. Fixed costs (such as rent or an audit fee) vary on a percentage basis because the lump sum rent/audit amount as a percentage will vary depending on the amount of assets a fund has acquired. Thus, most of a fund's expenses behave as a variable expense and thus, are a constant fixed percentage of fund assets. It is, therefore, very hard for a fund to significantly reduce its expense ratio after it has some history. Thus, if an investor buys a fund with a high expense ratio that has some history, he/she should not expect any significant reduction.  
  
Expenses matter relative to investment type

There are three broad investment categories for mutual funds (equity, bond, and money market - in declining order of historical returns). That is an oversimplification but adequate to explain the effect of expenses. In an equity fund where the historical gross return might be 10%, a 1% expense ratio will consume approximately 10% of the investor's return. In a bond fund where the historical gross return might be 8%, a 1% expense ratio will consume approximately 12.5% of the investor's return. In a money market fund where the historical gross return might be 5%, a 1% expense ratio will consume approximately 20% of the investor's historical total return. Thus, an investor must consider a fund's expense ratio as it relates to the type of investments a fund will hold.

Other expenses

"Other expenses" are expenses not included under "Management Fees" or "Distribution or Service (12b-1) Fees", such as any shareholder service expenses that are not already included in the 12b-1 fees, custodial expenses, legal and accounting expenses, transfer agent expenses, and other administrative expenses.

References

External links
Mutual Fund Fees and Expenses A concise but complete tutorial about mutual fund fees and expenses in a one-page format with sidebars, illustrations, formulas, examples, and clear definitions of basic terms.
Compute a fund's total costs from the turn over ratio and the total expense ratio

Mutual funds